USS San Francisco (CA-38), a , was the second ship of three of the United States Navy named after the city of San Francisco, California. Commissioned in 1934, she was one of the most decorated ships of World War II, earning 17 battle stars and the Presidential Unit Citation.

Like most of her sister ships, she saw extensive action during the Guadalcanal campaign, including the Battle of Cape Esperance and the Naval Battle of Guadalcanal, during which she was heavily damaged and her captain and admiral killed. Earlier in the battle she mistakenly fired on the light cruiser , causing serious damage and inflicting numerous casualties.

Decommissioned immediately after the end of the war, she was sold for scrap in 1959.

Her bridge wings, damaged during the Naval Battle of Guadalcanal and removed during repairs, are now mounted on a promontory in Golden Gate National Recreation Area. They are set on the great circle course from San Francisco to Guadalcanal.

Construction and commissioning
San Francisco was laid down on 9 September 1931 at the Mare Island Navy Yard, Vallejo, California, under the supervision of Naval constructor Charles W. Fisher Jr.; launched on 9 March 1933; sponsored by Miss Barbara M. Bailly; and commissioned on 10 February 1934, Captain Royal E. Ingersoll in command.

The New Orleans-class cruisers were the last U.S. cruisers built to the specifications and standards of the Washington Naval Treaty of 1922.  Such ships, with a limit of 10,000 tons standard displacement and 8-inch caliber main guns, may be referred to as "treaty cruisers." Originally classified as a light cruiser before she was laid down due to her thin armor, she was reclassified as a heavy cruiser because of her 8-inch guns. The term "heavy cruiser" was not defined until the London Naval Treaty in 1930.

Inter-war period
After an extensive shakedown cruise – which included operations off Mexico, in Hawaiian waters, off Washington and British Columbia, and a voyage to the Panama Canal Zone – the cruiser returned to the Mare Island Navy Yard. Gunnery installation and conversion to a flagship took her into 1935. In February, she joined Cruiser Division 6 (Crudiv 6) at San Diego. In May, she moved north and participated in Fleet Problem XVI, then returned to southern California. A few weeks later, she was back off the northwest coast for fleet tactics, and in July, she steamed farther north to Alaska. In August, she returned to California and, through the end of 1938, San Francisco continued to range the eastern Pacific, cruising from the state of Washington to Peru and from California to Hawaii.

In January 1939, she departed the west coast to participate in Fleet Problem XX, conducted in the Atlantic east of the Lesser Antilles. In March, she became flagship of CruDiv 7 and commenced a goodwill tour of South American ports. Departing Guantanamo Bay Naval Base in early April, she called at ports on the east coast of that continent, moved through the Strait of Magellan and visited west coast ports, then in early June, transited the Panama Canal to complete her voyage around the continent.

World War II
On 1 September 1939, World War II started, and on 14 September, San Francisco moved south from Naval Station Norfolk to join the Neutrality Patrol. The cruiser carried freight and passengers to San Juan, Puerto Rico, thence sailed for a patrol of the West Indies as far south as Trinidad. On 14 October, she completed her patrol back at San Juan and headed for Norfolk, where she remained into January 1940.

Transiting the Panama Canal in late February, she called at San Pedro and, in March, continued on to her new home port, Pearl Harbor, where she rejoined CruDiv 6. In May 1940, she steamed northwest to the Puget Sound Navy Yard for an overhaul, during which she also received four  guns. On 29 September, she returned to Pearl Harbor. In early May 1941, she became flagship of CruDiv 6; and, at the end of July, she moved east for a cruise to Long Beach, California, returning to Hawaii on 27 August. In September, the flag of CruDiv 6 was hauled down; and on 11 October, San Francisco entered the Pearl Harbor Navy Yard for an overhaul which was scheduled for completion on 25 December.

Pearl Harbor attack
On 7 December 1941, San Francisco was in Pearl Harbor awaiting docking and the cleaning of her heavily fouled bottom. Her engineering plant was largely broken down for overhaul. Ammunition for her 5 in (127mm) and 8 in (203mm) guns had been placed in storage. Her  guns had been removed to permit installation of four  quadruple mounts, although the mounts had not yet been installed. Her  machine guns were being overhauled. Only small arms and two  machine guns were available. Moreover, a number of San Francisco's officers and men were absent.

At 0755, Japanese planes began dive-bombing Battleship Row near Ford Island. Off-duty signalman Ed Ifkin was relaxing on the signal bridge.

"I was reading the newspaper I'd just bought at the kiosk on the wharf, when an airplane buzzed over my head with that big red meatball on its side.  I was trained to recognize foreign insignia and knew right away it was Japanese.  I telephoned down to the bridge and told the duty officer.  He said, 'Ifkin, you'll go on report for horsing around,' when BOOM!  The first torpedo hit (USS) Oklahoma.  Our guns were down, so a bunch of us climbed over to New Orleans.  It was berthed right next us.  We spent the next two hours feeding ammunition to the gunners.

Ifkin is recognized as the first U.S. sailor to report the Japanese attack.

By 0800, the attack on Pearl Harbor was well underway. The men of San Francisco secured the ship for watertightness and began looking for opportunities to fight back. Others began using available rifles and machine guns.

"When the Japanese left, the entire harbor was a shambles", Iftkin recalled. "The fires, the oil in the water from the torpedoed ships .  .  . the Arizona burned for two days".

San Francisco was undamaged after the attack and work resumed to make her combat-ready.

On 14 December, the cruiser left the yard; the scaling of her keel had been postponed for more urgent repairs to other ships. On 16 December, she sortied with Task Force 14 (TF 14) to relieve Wake Island. However, when Wake Island fell to the Japanese on 23 December, TF 14 was diverted to Midway Atoll, which it reinforced. On 29 December, the force returned to Pearl Harbor.

1942
On 8 January 1942, San Francisco again moved west. In TF 8, she steamed toward Samoa to rendezvous with, and cover the off-loading of, transports carrying reinforcements to Tutuila, Samoa. There, she joined Task Force 17 for raids on Japanese installations in the Gilbert and Marshall Islands. San Francisco arrived in the Samoan area on 18 January, and on the 24th was detached to continue coverage for the transports while the remainder of the task force and TF 17 conducted offensive operations to the northwest.

On 8 February, San Francisco departed from Tutuila. On the 10th, she rejoined CruDiv 6, then in TF 11, and she set a course for an area northeast of the Solomon Islands to strike Rabaul. However, the American force was sighted and attacked by two waves of Mitsubishi G4M "Betty" medium bombers. Sixteen of the planes were destroyed, but since the element of surprise had been lost, TF 11 retired eastward.

During the next few days, TF 11 – centered around  – conducted operations in the South Pacific Area, then headed for New Guinea to participate with TF 17 in a raid against Japanese shipping and installations.

On 7 March, one of San Franciscos scout planes was reported missing and could not be found.

On the night of 9–10 March, TFs 11 and 17 entered the Gulf of Papua, whence, at dawn, Lexington and  launched their aircraft to cross the Owen Stanley Range and attack the Japanese at Salamaua and Lae.

It had landed on the water, but had been unable to communicate. The pilot, Lieutenant J. A. Thomas, and the radioman, O. J. Gannan, had headed for Australia, sailing the plane backwards as it tended to head into the prevailing east wind. In five days and 21 hours, they had covered approximately 385 miles (715 km) on a course within 5 degrees of that intended.

San Francisco returned to Pearl Harbor on 26 March. On 22 April, the cruiser departed Oahu for San Francisco in the escort of convoy 4093. At the end of May, she headed west, escorting convoy PW 2076, made up of transports carrying the 37th Army Division, destined for Suva, and special troops bound for Australia. The cruiser remained in the escort force as far as Auckland, New Zealand. There she steamed for Hawaii, arriving at Pearl Harbor on 29 June.

From there, she got underway to rendezvous with the Solomon Islands Expeditionary Force.

Operation Watchtower – the Guadalcanal-Tulagi offensive – opened on the morning of 7 August. Through that day and the remainder of the month, San Francisco helped to cover the American forces in the area. The flag of Rear Admiral Norman Scott, commanding the cruisers attached to TF 18, was shifted to San Francisco.

On 3 September, San Franciscos force put into Nouméa, New Caledonia, for fuel and provisions. On 8 September, the ships departed that island to cover reinforcements moving up to Guadalcanal. On the 11th, San Franciscos force, TF 18, rendezvoused with TF 17, the  group, and the next day, both groups refueled at sea. On 14 September, the reinforcement convoy departed the New Hebrides. TF 61 commenced covering operations with TF 17, operating east of TF 18 and conforming to their movements.

At about 1450 on 15 September,  was torpedoed on the starboard side. Fires broke out on the carrier. Explosions multiplied the fires. Admiral Scott took command of TF 18. San Francisco and  prepared to take the carrier in tow, but by 1520, the fires were out of control and destroyers began taking on survivors.  torpedoed the burning hulk. TF 18 then headed for Espiritu Santo.

On the morning of 17 September, San Francisco, and five destroyers put back to sea to rendezvous with TF 17 and resume coverage of reinforcement convoys. Other units of TF 18 had headed for Nouméa with Wasp survivors.

The next day, the force headed to the New Hebrides.

Battle of Cape Esperance

On 7 October 1942, TF 64 (minus Chester and Minneapolis) departed from Espiritu Santo, the New Hebrides, and moved back into the Solomons to cover Allied reinforcements and to intercept similar operations by the Japanese. On 11 October, at about 1615, the ships commenced a run northward from Rennel Island, to intercept an enemy force of two cruisers and six destroyers reported heading for Guadalcanal from the Buin-Faisi, Bougainville Island area. The force continued north to approach Savo Island in The Slot from the southwest.

A few minutes after setting the new course, radar indicated unidentified ships to the west, several thousand yards distant. At about 2345, the Battle of Cape Esperance began.

Initial confusion caused both sides to momentarily check their fire in fear of hitting their own ships. Then, the battle was reopened and continued until 0020 on 12 October, when surviving Japanese ships retired toward the Shortland Islands. Later, Duncan went down.  and a destroyer had been sunk during the surface action. Two more enemy destroyers were sunk on 12 October by Marine planes from Henderson Field. After the engagement, TF 64 retired to Espiritu Santo.

On 15 October, San Francisco resumed operations in support of the Guadalcanal campaign. On the evening of 20 October, her group was ordered back to Espiritu Santo. At 2119, submarine's torpedoes were reported. Chester was hit amidships on the starboard side but continued under her own power. Two others were sighted running on the surface.

San Francisco reached Espiritu Santo on the night of 21 October, but departed again on 22 October to intercept any enemy surface units approaching Guadalcanal from the north and to cover friendly reinforcements. On 28 October, Admiral Scott transferred to Atlanta. The next day, San Francisco returned to Espiritu Santo, and on 30 October, Rear Admiral Daniel J. Callaghan, the commanding officer of San Francisco when the United States entered the war, returned to the ship and raised his flag as Commander, Task Group 64.4 (TG 64.4) and prospective TF 65.

Naval Battle of Guadalcanal

On 31 October 1942, the newly designated TF 65 departed from Espiritu Santo, the ships again headed into the Solomon Islands to cover troop landings on Guadalcanal. Bombardment missions in the Kokumbona and Koli Point areas followed. On 6 November, the transport group completed unloading, and the force retired, arriving at Espiritu Santo on 8 November. On 10 November, San Francisco, now flagship for TG 67.4, got underway again toward Guadalcanal.

Just before noon, a Japanese twin-float reconnaissance plane began shadowing the formation.

The force arrived off Lunga Point on 12 November, and the transports commenced unloading. By mid-afternoon, an approaching Japanese air group was reported. At 1318, the ships got underway. At 1408, 21 enemy planes attacked.

At 1416, an already-damaged torpedo bomber dropped its torpedo off San Franciscos starboard quarter. The torpedo passed alongside, but the plane crashed into San Franciscos control aft, swung around that structure, and plunged over the port side into the sea. 15 men were killed, 29 wounded, and one missing. Control aft was demolished. The ship's secondary command post, Battle Two, was burned out but reestablished by dark. The aft anti-aircraft director and radar were out, and three 20 mm mounts destroyed.

The covering force escorted the transports out of the area, then reassembled and returned. At about midnight, San Francisco, in company with heavy cruiser USS Portland, the light cruisers Atlanta, Helena, and Juneau, and eight destroyers, entered Lengo Channel.

Rear Admiral Callaghan's task group maneuvered to intercept, in what became the first engagement in the Naval Battle of Guadalcanal. Then in an attempt to locate other targets, San Francisco accidentally targeted . San Franciscos gunfire caused extensive damage to Atlanta, killing Admiral Scott and most of Atlantas bridge crew. Belatedly, San Francisco realized she was firing on a friendly ship and ceased. The green dye that San Francisco used to distinguish her shells from those of other ships, was later found on Atlantas superstructure before she sank. Shortly thereafter,  was sighted and taken under fire, at an initial range of only .

The enemy battleship joined the cruiser and the destroyer in firing on San Francisco whose port  battery engaged the destroyer but was put out of action, except for one mount. The battleship put the starboard  battery out of commission. San Francisco swung left while her main battery continued to fire on the battleships which, with the cruiser and the destroyer, continued to pound San Francisco. A direct hit on the navigation bridge killed or badly wounded all officers, except for the communications officer, Lieutenant Commander Bruce McCandless. Command fell to the damage control officer, Lieutenant Commander Herbert E. Schonland, but he thought his own efforts were needed to keep the ship "afloat and right-side up", so he ordered McCandless to stay at the conn. Steering and engine control were lost and shifted to Battle Two. Battle Two was out of commission by a direct hit from the port side, and control was again lost. It was reestablished in the conning tower, which itself soon received a hit from the starboard side. Steering and engine control were temporarily lost, and all communications were now dead.

Soon thereafter, the enemy ceased firing. San Francisco followed suit and withdrew eastward along the north coast of Guadalcanal.

Seventy-seven sailors, including Rear Admiral Daniel J. Callaghan and Captain Cassin Young, had been killed. Captain Young, like the San Francisco, was a veteran of the Pearl Harbor attack. 105 had been wounded. Of seven missing, three were subsequently rescued. The ship had taken 45 hits. Structural damage was extensive, but not fatal. No hits had been received below the waterline. Twenty-two fires had been extinguished.

At about 0400, San Francisco, all her compasses out, followed Helena and Juneau through Sealark Channel en route to Espiritu Santo for initial repairs.

At about 1000, Juneaus medical personnel transferred to San Francisco to assist in treating the numerous wounded. "The entire ship seemed to explode in one mighty column of brown and white smoke and flame which rose easily a thousand feet in the air. The Juneau literally disintegrated." San Francisco was hit by several large fragments from Juneau. One man was hit and both his legs broken. Nothing was seen in the water after the smoke lifted. The surviving ships were ordered to keep going without stopping to look for survivors. Unfortunately, the 100+ survivors (out of a total complement of 697) of Juneau were forced to wait eight days for rescue while floating in the ocean, undergoing intense shark attacks. Only ten survived.

On the afternoon of 14 November, San Francisco reached Espiritu Santo. For her participation in the action of the morning of the 13th, and for that of the night of 11–12 October, she received the Presidential Unit Citation. On 18 November, the cruiser sailed for Nouméa, and, on 23 November, she got underway toward the United States. She reached San Francisco on 11 December. Three days later, repairs were begun at Mare Island Naval Shipyard.

San Francisco had one current and three future Medal of Honor recipients on board at the time of the Battle of Guadalcanal.  Captain Cassin Young had received the Medal of Honor for heroism at Pearl Harbor 11 months earlier.  Rear Admiral Callaghan and Lieutenant Commanders Schonland and McCandless would receive the Medal of Honor at a later date.  Callaghan was one of three U.S. Navy admirals to receive the Medal of Honor posthumously during World War II along with admirals Isaac Kidd who was killed at Pearl Harbor and Norman Scott who also died in the Battle of Guadalcanal.

1943–1944
During the yard period to repair battle damage, San Francisco received a general modernization similar to other US cruisers.  Her forward superstructure was remodeled, with the bridge wings cut back, and most of the bridge windows either plated over or replaced by portholes.  A large open bridge was built out at the 02 level, and modern SG surface search radar and air search radars added.  In addition many 20mm and 40mm anti-aircraft cannons were installed.  On 26 February 1943, she got underway to return to the South Pacific. After escorting convoy PW 2211 en route, San Francisco arrived at Nouméa on 20 March. Five days later, she continued on to Efate. She arrived back in the Hawaiian Islands in mid-April. She then headed north to the Aleutian Islands to join the North Pacific Force, TF 16, and reached Alaska toward the end of the month. Based at Kuluk Bay, Adak Island, she operated in the Aleutians for the next  months. She patrolled the western approaches to the area; participated in the assault and occupation of Attu in May and of Kiska in July; and performed escort duties.

In mid-September, she was ordered back to Pearl Harbor for repairs and reassignment to TF 14. On 29 September, San Francisco departed Pearl Harbor in Task Unit 14.2.1 (TU 14.2.1) for a raid against Wake Island. On 5 October, the group arrived off the target area and conducted two runs by the enemy positions. On 11 October, her task unit returned to Pearl Harbor.

On 20 November, the force arrived off Makin. San Francisco participated in the pre-invasion bombardment of Betio, then patrolled outside the transport area to the west of Makin. With that force, she steamed toward the Marshall Islands to strike Japanese shipping and installations in the Kwajalein area. On 4 December, the carriers launched their planes against the targets. Shortly after noon, enemy aerial activity increased, and at 1250, San Francisco came under attack. Three torpedo bombers closed her on the port bow. Her guns "splashed" two. The third was shot down by Yorktown. But during the attack, the cruiser had been strafed several times. One man had been killed, and 22 were wounded. After dark, the Japanese returned, and on that night, Lexington was torpedoed. The force moved north and west. Shortly after 0130 on 5 December, enemy planes faded from the radar screens. The next day, the ships headed back to Pearl Harbor.

On 22 January 1944, San Francisco sortied with TF 52 and again headed for the Marshalls. On 29 January, the division, screened by destroyers, left the formation and moved against Japanese installations on Maloelap to neutralize them during the conquest of Kwajalein. Following the bombardment, the ships proceeded on to Kwajalein. San Francisco arrived off the atoll at about 0630 on 31 January. At 0730, she opened fire on targets of opportunity, initially a small ship inside Kwajalein lagoon. At 0849, she ceased firing. At 0900, she resumed firing at targets on Berlin and Beverly islands. Through the day, she continued to shell those islands, and, in late afternoon, added Bennett Island to her targets. During the next week, she provided pre-landing barrages and support fire for operations against Burton, Berlin, and Beverly islands. On 8 February, the cruiser sailed for Majuro, whence she would operate as a unit of TF 58, the fast carrier task force.

On 12 February, San Francisco, in TG 58.2, cleared Majuro lagoon. Four days later, the carriers launched their planes as part of Operation Hailstone. On the night of 16–17 February,  was torpedoed. San Francisco, with others, was assigned to escort her eastward. On 19 February, the group split; Intrepid, with two destroyers, continued toward Pearl Harbor, while San Francisco and the remaining ships headed for Majuro. On 25 February, San Francisco sailed for Hawaii with TG 58.2. On 20 March, the group returned to Majuro, refueled, and departed again on 22 March to move against the Western Carolines. From 30 March to 1 April, carrier planes hit the Palaus and Woleai. San Franciscos planes flew rescue missions.

On 6 April, the force was back in Majuro lagoon. A week later, the ships set a course for New Guinea. From 21 to 28 April, TG 58.2 supported the assault landings in the Hollandia (currently known as Jayapura) area. On 29 April, the ships moved back into the Carolines for another raid against Truk. On 30 April, San Francisco was detached and, with eight other cruisers, moved against Satawan. On completion of that bombardment mission, the cruisers rejoined TG 58.2 and headed back to the Marshalls.

Initially at Majuro, San Francisco shifted to Kwajalein in early June, and on 10 June, departed that atoll in TG 53.15, the bombardment group of the Saipan invasion force. On 14 June, she commenced two days of shelling Tinian, and after the landings on Saipan shifted to fire support duties. On 16 June, she temporarily joined CruDiv 9 to bombard Guam. Word of a Japanese force en route to Saipan, however, interrupted the cannonade, and the ships returned to Saipan.

On 17 June, San Francisco refueled and took up station between the approaching enemy force and the amphibious force at Saipan. On the morning of 19 June, the Battle of the Philippine Sea opened for San Francisco. At about 1046, she was straddled fore and aft by bombs. At 1126, the cruiser opened fire. A 40 mm shell from Indianapolis set off San Franciscos smoke screen generators. By noon, quiet had returned. At 1424, dive bombers made the last Japanese attack. By 20 June, San Francisco steamed westward in pursuit of the Japanese force. The next day, she returned to the Saipan area and resumed operations with the covering force for the transports. On 8 July, San Francisco again steamed to Guam to bombard enemy positions. During the next four days, she shelled targets in the Agat and Agana areas. On 12 July, she returned to Saipan to replenish and refuel, and on 18 July, again took station off Guam.

From 18 to 20 July, she shelled enemy positions, supported beach demolition units, and provided night harassing and defense repair interdiction in the Agat and Faci Point areas. On 21 July, she began to support Marines assaulting the Agat beaches. On 24 July, the cruiser shifted her fire to Orote Point.

On 30 July, she headed, via Eniwetok and Pearl Harbor, for San Francisco. The cruiser arrived back on the west coast on 16 August for overhaul.

On 31 October, she steamed west again, and on 21 November arrived at Ulithi, where she resumed flagship duties for CruDiv 6. On 10 December, she cleared the anchorage and moved toward the Philippines in TG 38.1. On 14–15 December, during carrier strikes against Luzon, San Franciscos planes were employed on antisubmarine patrol and in rescue work. On 16 December, the force headed for a rendezvous with TG 30.17, the replenishment force. A typhoon interrupted the refueling operations; and the ships rode out the storm for the next two days. On 19 December, she participated in a search for survivors from three destroyers which had gone down during the typhoon.

On 20 December, TF 38 turned westward again to resume operations against Luzon; but high seas precluded strikes. On 24 December, the force returned to Ulithi.

1945
Six days later, the force again sortied from Ulithi. On 2–3 January 1945, strikes were conducted against Formosa. From 5–7 January, Luzon was hit. On 9 January, fighter sweeps against Formosa were resumed. The force then headed for the Bashi Channel and a five-day, high-speed strike against enemy surface units in the South China Sea and against installations along the coast of Indochina. On 15–16 January, the Hong Kong-Amoy-Swatow area was hit, and on 20 January, the force passed through Luzon Strait to resume operations against Formosa. On 21 January, aerial opposition was constant. On 22 January, strikes were launched against the Ryukyu Islands, and the next day, the force headed for the Western Carolines.

Arriving on 26 January, the ships sailed again on 10 February. On 16–17 February, strikes were conducted against air facilities in central Honshū. On 18 February, the force moved toward the Volcano and Bonin Islands, and on 19 February, covering operations for the Iwo Jima assault began. The next day, San Francisco closed on Iwo Jima with other cruisers and assumed fire support duties, which she continued until 23 February. Then she headed back toward Japan. On 25 February, Tokyo was the target. Poor weather prohibited operations against Nagoya on the following day, and on 27 February, the force headed back to Ulithi.

On 21 March, San Francisco, now attached to Task Force 54 (TF 54) for the invasion of Okinawa, departed Ulithi for the Ryukyus. On 25 March, she approached Kerama Retto, west of Okinawa, and furnished fire support for minesweeping and underwater demolition operations. That night, she retired and the next morning moved back in to support the landings and supply counter battery fire on Aka, Keruma, Zamami, and Yakabi Islands.

By the morning of 27 March, aerial resistance had begun. The next day, San Francisco shifted to Okinawa for shore bombardment in preparation for the assault landings scheduled for 1 April. On that day, she took up station in fire support sector 5, west of Naha, and, for the next five days, shelled enemy emplacements, caves, pillboxes, road junctions, and tanks, truck, and troop concentrations. At night, she provided harassing fire near the beachhead.

On 6 April, the cruiser retired to Kerama Retto, refueled and took on ammunition, assisted in splashing a Nakajima B6N "Jill" torpedo bomber, then rejoined TF 54 off Okinawa as that force underwent another air raid. San Francisco downed a Nakajima B5N "Kate" torpedo bomber. Dawn of 7 April brought another air raid, during which a kamikaze attempted to crash the cruiser. After the raid, San Francisco shifted to TF 51 for fire support missions on the east coast of Okinawa, rejoining TF 54 on the west coast in late afternoon. On 11 April, air attacks increased, and the next day, San Francisco set an Aichi D3A "Val" dive bomber on fire. The plane then glanced off a merchant ship and hit the water, enveloped in flames.

On 13–14 April, the cruiser again operated with TF 51 off the east coast of the embattled island. The next day, she returned to Kerama Retto, there proceeding to Okinawa and operations with TF 54 in the transport area. There she provided night illumination to detect swimmers and Shinyo suicide boats, and just before midnight assisted in sinking one of the latter. During the night, two further attempts by Shinyos to close the transports were thwarted.

With dawn, San Francisco returned to the Naha area to shell the airfield there. On 17 April, she moved up the coast and fired on the Machinate air field. The next day, she again shifted to the eastern side of the island and, that night, anchored in Nakagusuku Wan. The next day, San Francisco supported troops in the southern part of the island. From 21 to 24 April, she shelled targets in the Naha airstrip area; and got underway for Ulithi.

On 13 May, San Francisco returned to Okinawa, arriving in Nakagusuku Wan and resuming support activities against targets in southern Okinawa. For the next few days, San Francisco supported the 96th Infantry Division in an area to the southeast of Yonabaru. On 20 May, she shifted to Kutaka Shima, and by the night of 22 May, she had depleted her supply of ammunition for her main batteries. On 25 May, the Japanese launched a large air attack against Allied shipping in Nakagusuku Wan. On 27 May, San Francisco provided fire support for the 77th Infantry Division, and retired to Kerama Retto the next day. On 30 May, the cruiser returned to the western side of Okinawa and, for the next two weeks, supported operations of the 1st and 6th Marine Divisions.

A week later, she put into Kerama Retto for a brief stay, then rejoined that group. In early July, she provided cover for the eastern anchorage. On 3 July, she sailed toward the Philippines to prepare for an invasion of the Japanese home islands. The cessation of hostilities in mid-August, however, obviated that operation, and San Francisco prepared for occupation duty.

Between 7 December 1941 and 7 October 1945, San Francisco travelled 480,000 km and burned 114,478,423 litres of fuel oil. On her voyages, she crossed the equator 24 times and the international date line 33 times. Her guns fired 11,022 203mm shells, 24,191 127mm shells, 70,243 40mm shells and 73,904 20mm shells and her crew suffered 267 combat casualties. Her planes flew for 3,714 hours. The crew consumed 3,983,712 kg of edible provisions, ate 332,937 kg of beef, ate 925,328 kg of potatoes & ate 5,760,000 slices of bread.

Post-war
On 28 August 1945, the cruiser departed Subic Bay for the China coast. After a show of force in the Yellow Sea and Gulf of Pohai areas, she covered minesweeping operations, and on 8 October anchored at Inchon, Korea. From 13 to 16 October, she participated in another show of force operation in the Gulf of Pohai area, then returned to Inchon, where Rear Admiral Jerauld Wright, Commander, CruDiv 6, acted as senior member of the committee for the surrender of Japanese naval forces in Korea.

On 27 November, San Francisco headed home. Arriving at San Francisco in mid-December, she continued on to the east coast on 5 January 1946, and arrived at Philadelphia, Pennsylvania, for inactivation on 19 January. Decommissioned on 10 February, she was berthed with the Philadelphia Group of the Atlantic Reserve Fleet until 1 March 1959, when her name was struck from the Naval Vessel Register. On 9 September, she was sold to the Union Mineral and Alloys Corp., New York, and scrapped at Panama City, Florida, in 1961.

War memorials

During the December 1942 repair at Mare Island, it was necessary to extensively rebuild the bridge. The bridge wings were removed as part of that repair, and are now part of a memorial to the ship on a promontory in Lands End, San Francisco at Golden Gate National Recreation Area overlooking the Pacific Ocean. One wing has extensive battle damage from the Naval Battle of Guadalcanal. They are set on the great circle course from San Francisco to Guadalcanal. The old ship's bell is housed at the Marines Memorial Club in San Francisco.

Awards

San Francisco earned 17 battle stars during World War II, and when combined with the crewmember's awards of Medals of Honor, Navy Crosses, Silver Stars, etc., she is the second most decorated US ship of World War II after USS Enterprise, CV-6. For her participation in the Naval Battle of Guadalcanal and Battle of Cape Esperance, she was awarded the Presidential Unit Citation with star. For the same action, three members of her crew were awarded the Medal of Honor: Lieutenant Commander Herbert E. Schonland, Lieutenant Commander Bruce McCandless, and Boatswain's Mate 1st Class Reinhardt J. Keppler (posthumous). Admiral Callaghan was also awarded the Medal of Honor (posthumous). San Francisco was among the most decorated ships in US service during World War II.

References

Citations

General sources 
 
 
 
 
 
  First-hand account of the Naval Battle of Guadalcanal by the captain of the Japanese destroyer Amatsukaze.

External links

history.navy.mil/photos: USS San Francisco
history.navy.mil/danfs: USS San Francisco
hazegray.org: USS San Francisco
USS San Francisco Damage Report for Guadalcanal action
Cruiser Scout, by Paul A. McKinley   An account of Service on the ship from 1937 to 1942.

 

New Orleans-class cruisers
Ships built in Vallejo, California
1933 ships
World War II cruisers of the United States
Ships present during the attack on Pearl Harbor
Ships of the Aleutian Islands campaign